HMS Marksman was a  of the British Royal Navy. Construction at Hawthorn Leslie's Newcastle upon Tyne shipyard began in 1914, shortly before the outbreak of the First World War, and the ship was launched and completed in 1915. She took part in the Battle of Jutland in 1916 and survived the war. She was sold  for scrap in 1921.

Construction and design
The British Admiralty ordered the first two ships of the new s under the 1913–14 Construction Programme. Flotilla Leaders were large destroyer-type vessels intended to lead flotillas of smaller destroyers in action. The two ships,  and Marksman, were intended to lead the 1st and 3rd Destroyer Flotillas, and so had names to match the L and M-class destroyers that would equip these flotillas.

The design displacement was  normal and  full load, with a displacement of  stated for Marksman in 1919. Cruising turbines were fitted to the outer shafts. Four funnels were fitted.

The ship's main gun armament consisted of four QF  Mk IV guns mounted on the ships centreline, with two of the guns positioned between the ship's funnels. An anti-aircraft armament of two 1-pounder (37 mm) "pom-pom" autocannons was planned, but during construction the 1-pounder pom-poms were diverted to the British Expeditionary Force when it deployed to France at the start of the First World War, and the ship completed with two 2-pounder (40-mm) "pom-pom"s instead. Torpedo armament consisted of two twin 21-inch (533 mm) torpedo tubes. The ship's crew was 104 officers and men.

Marksman was laid down at Hawthorn Leslie's Newcastle upon Tyne shipyard on 20 July 1914, was launched on 12 May 1915 and completed on 18 November 1915.

Service
On commissioning, Marksman joined the newly established 12th Destroyer Flotilla of the Grand Fleet as leader. By May 1916, the arrival of  saw Marksman being relegated to second in command of the Flotilla, with the Captain (D) transferring to Faulknor.

Marksman was still part of the 12th Destroyer Flotilla at the Battle of Jutland on 31 May-1 June 1916, operating in support of the Grand Fleet. During the night of the battle, the flotilla was still largely intact, with Faulknor leading eight destroyers and Marksman following with a further four (and ). At about 01:43 hr Greenwich Mean Time (GMT) (02:43 CET), Faulknor spotted a group of German battleships and manoeuvred to set up a torpedo attack. While doing so, Faulknor carried out a 180 degree turn which resulting in steering towards Marksman and her destroyers. In avoiding collision, Marksman lost touch both with the enemy and her four destroyers, and so did not take place in the flotilla's torpedo attack, which resulted in the German pre-dreadnought battleship  being sunk. Marksman later (at between 02:15 and 02:25 GMT) joined up with the cruiser  and some destroyers of the 13th Flotilla, and at about 03:25 got into a brief exchange of fire with four German destroyers, during which several torpedoes fired at the British ships missed, while one of the German destroyers was damaged by Champions fire. Marksman picked up a single survivor, the ship's captain, from the sunken destroyer , with two more picked up by the destroyer . At 06:00 the badly damaged destroyer  was encountered and Marksman attempted to take her under tow, but this failed. After taking off Sparrowhawks crew, Marksman scuttled Sparrowhawk with gunfire.

In mid-July 1916, in response to an intelligence report that a German commerce raider was about to set out on a raid, a large scale operation was launched by the Royal Navy to prevent a breakout into the Atlantic involving 14 cruisers, 13 armed merchant cruisers and 18 destroyers. As part of these operations, Marksman and sister ship  patrolled the Fair Isle channel between the Orkney and Shetland Islands from 11 to 13 July. Nothing was found by these operations.

Marksman remained part of the 12th Flotilla well into 1917, transferring to the 6th Destroyer Flotilla, part of the Dover Patrol, on 26 August 1917. Large destroyers and leaders like Marksman tended to be employed on patrols along two routes to protect the Dover Barrage, the West Barrage Patrol and the East Barrage Patrol. None of the defensive forces managed to interfere with the German attack, which sank one trawler and seven drifters while severely damaging a further one trawler, five drifters and one minesweeper.

On 23 March 1918, Marksman left the 6th Destroyer Flotilla and rejoined the Grand Fleet as part of the 11th Destroyer Flotilla. In July 1918, Marksman transferred to the Northern Patrol and on 12 July 1918 she led a major operation to intercept the homewards bound German cruiser submarine  between the Shetland and Faeroe Islands. The submarine was detected by hydrophones of the force near the island of Suðuroy and the destroyer  dropped depth charges twice, but U-151 escaped unharmed. Marksman remained with the Northern Patrol force until the end of the war. Charles Hammond sank early in the morning of the next day, while Marksman was under repair at Leith until 31 December 1918.

Disposal
Marksman was paid off at Devonport on 25 November 1919, and was sold for scrap on 8 November 1921 and broken up in Germany.

Pennant numbers

Notes

Citations

Bibliography

External links 

 Battle of Jutland Crew Lists Project - HMS Marksman Crew List

Marksman-class flotilla leaders
World War I destroyers of the United Kingdom
Ships built on the River Tyne
1915 ships